House Party New Orleans Style (subtitled The Lost Sessions, 1971–1972) is a compilation album by the American musician Professor Longhair, released in 1987. The tracks were originally intended for Atlantic Records; the recording sessions were among Professor Longhair's first after his live show comeback in the early 1970s.

The album won a Grammy Award, in the "Best Traditional Blues Recording" category.

Production
The album was produced by Quint Davis. The songs were recorded in 1971 and 1972; they were stored in the vaults of Bearsville Records before being released in 1987. Snooks Eaglin played on all of the tracks; Ziggy Modeliste played on a handful. The album includes some of Professor Longhair's lesser known material.

Critical reception

The New York Times wrote that "these are among the liveliest, truest records the Professor ever made, among other things the prototype of the kind of pianism found on Little Richard's early rock records." Robert Christgau opined that "Fess's wobbly vocals and careening piano apotheosized [New Orleans'] crazy independence the way Allen Toussaint's did (if not does) its pop affability."

The Washington Post listed the album as one of the best of 1987, calling it "an infectious mid-career look at Longhair's rumbaesque piano (and Zig Modeliste's propulsive drumming)." The Toronto Star deemed it "a resilient and hungry work that ranks as one of Longhair's best records, an instant collectible."

AllMusic wrote that "Eaglin's flashy, inventive solos were excellent contrasts to Longhair's rippling keyboard flurries and distinctive mix of yodels, yells, cries and shouts." The Penguin Guide to Blues Recordings determined that "the rhythm sections are outstandingly funky, and Snooks Eaglin, then also making his return to the limelight, plays at the height of his inventiveness."

Track listing

References

Professor Longhair albums
1987 compilation albums
Rounder Records albums